Lebia is a genus of predatory ground beetles. Common names include colorful foliage ground beetles and flat ground beetles. They are found worldwide and there over 700 species in 17 subgenera.

Description
Small or medium-sized beetles, often iridescent or vividly coloured with wide, flattened elytra. They are often found on foliage and flowers. They eat small insects and some species are parasitic on leaf beetle larvae.

Species
Subgenus Chelonodema

 Lebia albosinuata (Putzeys, 1846) 
 Lebia albovariegata (Chaudoir, 1871) 
 Lebia azteca Reichardt, 1972 
 Lebia balli Reichardt, 1972 
 Lebia baturitea Reichardt, 1972 
 Lebia birai Reichardt, 1972 
 Lebia boliviensis (Chaudoir, 1871) 
 Lebia caligula (Reichardt, 1971) 
 Lebia championi (Bates, 1883) 
 Lebia clavata Liebke, 1929 
 Lebia cyclopica Reichardt, 1972 
 Lebia decemmaculata (Chaudoir, 1871) 
 Lebia duodecimpunctata Dejean, 1831 
 Lebia erotyloides Reichardt, 1972 
 Lebia fasciata (Sturm, 1843) 
 Lebia howdeni Reichardt, 1972 
 Lebia inbio Erwin, 2000 
 Lebia macromaculata Mateu, 1993
 Lebia mathani Reichardt, 1972 
 Lebia melanocrepis (Bates, 1883) 
 Lebia mocoronga Reichardt, 1972 
 Lebia nigromarginata (Chaudoir, 1871) 
 Lebia nigropicta (Chaudoir, 1871)
 Lebia novemmaculata (Liebke, 1928) 
 Lebia ocelligera (Bates, 1883) 
 Lebia omophoita Reichardt, 1972 
 Lebia passoura Reichardt, 1972 
 Lebia piresa (Liebke, 1935) 
 Lebia pujoli Reichardt, 1972 
 Lebia quadriannulata (Bates, 1878) 
 Lebia quadrinotata Chevrolat, 1835 
 Lebia quipapa Reichardt, 1972 
 Lebia sagarana Reichardt, 1972 
 Lebia scripta (Castelnau, 1834) 
 Lebia signatipennis Perty, 1830 
 Lebia testacea Dejean, 1831 
 Lebia thomsoni (Chaudoir, 1871) 
 Lebia toroana (Liebke, 1951) 
 Lebia trifasciata (Chaudoir, 1871) 
 Lebia variabilis (Castelnau, 1834) 
 Lebia ytu Reichardt, 1972 

Subgenus Cymatographa
 Lebia undulata Dejean, 1831 

Subgenus Glyciolebia
 Lebia arcuata (Reiche & Saulcy, 1855)

Subgenus Grammica
 Lebia hexasticta (Liebke, 1935)
 Lebia pictipennis (Chaudoir, 1871)
 Lebia scutellata Putzeys, 1846

Subgenus Lamprias
 
 Lebia chlorocephala (J.J. Hoffmann, 1803) 
 Lebia chrysis Reitter, 1892
 Lebia coelestis Bates, 1888 
 Lebia cyanocephala (Linnaeus, 1758) 
 Lebia divisa Leconte, 1850 
 Lebia festiva Faldermann, 1836 
 Lebia fulvicollis (Fabricius, 1792) 
 Lebia irakensis Jedlicka, 1963 
 Lebia lucilla Reitter, 1898A: 224 
 Lebia pubipennis L. Dufour, 1820
 Lebia punctata Gebler, 1843 
 Lebia rufipes Dejean, 1825 
 Lebia rutilicollis Reitter, 1915
 Lebia viridana Reitter, 1898

Subgenus Lebia

 Lebia abdita Madge, 1967 
 Lebia abdominalis Chaudoir, 1843 
 Lebia acutangula Jordan, 1894 
 Lebia adamantina Peringuey, 1896 
 Lebia adusta Baehr, 2004 
 Lebia aegra Chaudoir, 1871 
 Lebia aethiopica Chaudoir, 1876 
 Lebia agnata Chaudoir, 1871 
 Lebia albidipennis Chaudoir, 1878 
 Lebia allardi Basilewsky, 1963  
 Lebia amabilicolor Lorenz, 1998 
 Lebia amabilis (Chaudoir, 1871) 
 Lebia amoenula (Chaudoir, 1871) 
 Lebia analis Dejean, 1825 
 Lebia anchorago Chaudoir, 1871 
 Lebia anchoralis Basilewsky, 1949 
 Lebia anchorifera (Chaudoir, 1871) 
 Lebia andina Liebke, 1939 
 Lebia andrewesi Jedlicka, 1933
 Lebia angolana Basilewsky, 1949 
 Lebia angulata Dejean, 1831 
 Lebia angusticollis Putzeys, 1846 
 Lebia annuligera Chaudoir, 1871 
 Lebia annulipennis Putzeys, 1846 
 Lebia apicalis Chevrolat, 1834 
 Lebia apicefusca Barker, 1922 
 Lebia argutula (Chaudoir, 1871) 
 Lebia arietis Bates, 1883 
 Lebia arisana Jedlicka, 1951
 Lebia arizonica Schaeffer, 1910 
 Lebia armata Liebke, 1935 
 Lebia arrowi Jedlicka, 1934 
 Lebia ascendens Chaudoir, 1871 
 Lebia asterisca Chaudoir, 1871 
 Lebia atricapillus Liebke, 1931 
 Lebia atripennis Baehr, 2004 
 Lebia australica Baehr, 2004 
 Lebia aviatica Liebke, 1935 
 Lebia azurea Solier, 1849 
 Lebia badakschana Jedlicka, 1956
 Lebia balteata Heyden, 1886
 Lebia barda Darlington, 1968 
 Lebia basiguttata Motschulsky, 1864 
 Lebia bella Andrewes, 1938 
 Lebia biannulata Chaudoir, 1871 
 Lebia bicolor (Sloane, 1907) 
 Lebia bicurvata Liebke, 1938 
 Lebia bifasciata Dejean, 1825 
 Lebia biforis Bates, 1883 
 Lebia bifossifrons Basilewsky, 1962 
 Lebia bilineata Motschulsky, 1859 
 Lebia binotata Buquet, 1834 
 Lebia bioculata Boheman, 1858 
 Lebia biplagiatella Csiki, 1932 
 Lebia bipunctata Chevrolat, 1835 
 Lebia bitaeniata Chevrolat, 1834 
 Lebia bivittata (Fabricius, 1798) 
 Lebia bivitticollis Bates, 1883 
 Lebia bivulnerata Motschulsky, 1864 
 Lebia boliviana Liebke, 1938 
 Lebia boysii Chaudoir, 1850
 Lebia brachinoides Reiche, 1842 
 Lebia breuningi Basilewsky, 1948 
 Lebia brevilimbata Pic, 1922 
 Lebia brisbanensis Baehr, 2004 
 Lebia bruchi Liebke, 1936  
 Lebia bumeliae Schaeffer, 1910 
 Lebia c-nigrum Putzeys, 1846 
 Lebia caeca Gory, 1833 
 Lebia callanga Liebke, 1935 
 Lebia calliope Bates, 1883 
 Lebia calliparis Bates, 1883 
 Lebia callitrema Bates, 1889
 Lebia campania Andrewes, 1933 
 Lebia cannae Steinheil, 1875 
 Lebia cardoni Bates, 1892 
 Lebia centromaculata Putzeys, 1846 
 Lebia chacoensis Liebke, 1935 
 Lebia chalcoma Andrewes, 1947 
 Lebia chalcoptera Gemminger & Harold, 1868 
 Lebia chalybe Bates, 1883 
 Lebia chalybeipennis R.F.Sahlberg, 1844  
 Lebia charilla Bates, 1883 
 Lebia charina Bates, 1878 
 Lebia charisma Liebke, 1938 
 Lebia chelostigma Bates, 1883 
 Lebia chinensis Boheman, 1858
 Lebia chiponica Jedlicka, 1939
 Lebia chiriquensis Bates, 1883 
 Lebia chlorotica Dejean, 1831 
 Lebia chopimana Liebke, 1938 
 Lebia chrysomyia Bates, 1888
 Lebia chyulana Basilewsky, 1948 
 Lebia circumdata Schmidt-Goebel, 1846 
 Lebia clarissa Andrewes, 1929 
 Lebia clio Bates, 1883 
 Lebia coelina Bates, 1883 
 Lebia coerulea Buquet, 1834 
 Lebia cognata Chaudoir, 1871 
 Lebia collaris Dejean, 1826  
 Lebia colmanti Burgeon, 1937 
 Lebia concinna Brulle, 1838 
 Lebia confusa Chaudoir, 1871 
 Lebia confusula Chaudoir, 1871 
 Lebia congoana Burgeon, 1937  
 Lebia congrua Peringuey, 1896 
 Lebia congruens Peringuey, 1899 
 Lebia conjugata Motschulsky, 1864 
 Lebia consularis Chaudoir, 1871 
 Lebia contaminata Mannerheim, 1837 
 Lebia contigua Chaudoir, 1871 
 Lebia coptoderina Bates, 1883 
 Lebia coptoderopsis Burgeon, 1937 
 Lebia corcula Bates, 1878 
 Lebia cordelia Bates, 1883 
 Lebia cordifer Darlington, 1968 
 Lebia coronata Liebke, 1938 
 Lebia costaricensis Liebke, 1935 
 Lebia crinalis Liebke, 1939 
 Lebia croceicollis Bates, 1883 
 Lebia cruciata Landin, 1955 
 Lebia crucifera Boheman, 1860 
 Lebia cruciferella Kuntzen, 1919 
 Lebia cruralis Basilewsky, 1948 
 Lebia cruxminor (Linnaeus, 1758)
 Lebia cumanensis Putzeys, 1846 
 Lebia cuonaensis Yu, 1981
 Lebia cupripennis Chaudoir, 1850 
 Lebia cursor Chaudoir, 1871 
 Lebia curvipicta Liebke, 1935 
 Lebia cyanipennis Dejean, 1831 
 Lebia cyanytheana Basilewsky, 1968 
 Lebia cymindoides Bates, 1883 
 Lebia daguerrei Liebke, 1939 
 Lebia darlingtoni Louwerens, 1953 
 Lebia darlingtoniana Baehr, 2004 
 Lebia debilis Peringuey, 1896  
 Lebia decellei Basilewsky, 1968  
 Lebia declivis Liebke, 1934 
 Lebia decolor (Bates, 1883) 
 Lebia delineata Brulle, 1838 
 Lebia dentata Chaudoir, 1871 
 Lebia denticulata Chaudoir, 1871 
 Lebia dentipicta Liebke, 1938 
 Lebia desaegeri Basilewsky, 1962 
 Lebia dichroma Andrewes, 1923 
 Lebia diehli Liebke, 1951 
 Lebia discernenda Chaudoir, 1871 
 Lebia disconotata (Chaudoir, 1871) 
 Lebia discopicta (Chaudoir, 1871) 
 Lebia discrepans Peringuey, 1899 
 Lebia distigma Liebke, 1934 
 Lebia distinguenda Putzeys, 1846 
 Lebia ditissima Bates, 1883 
 Lebia dorsalis Dejean, 1826 
 Lebia dubia Peringuey, 1896 
 Lebia dugesi Bates, 1883 
 Lebia duillia Bates, 1883 
 Lebia durbanensis Barker, 1922 
 Lebia eberti Jedlicka, 1965
 Lebia edentata Baehr, 2007 
 Lebia edithae Reitter, 1914
 Lebia elegans Gory, 1833 
 Lebia elegantissima Lutshnik, 1922 
 Lebia elegantula (Chaudoir, 1871) 
 Lebia elimata Liebke, 1939 
 Lebia emblemata Liebke, 1938 
 Lebia emendata Liebke, 1939 
 Lebia endynomena Darlington, 1968 
 Lebia ephippiata Andrewes, 1933 
 Lebia epigramma Liebke, 1938 
 Lebia epiphaea Chaudoir, 1871 
 Lebia erythreensis Basilewsky, 1947 
 Lebia estebana Liebke, 1935 
 Lebia esurialis Casey, 1920 
 Lebia exarata (Kirsch, 1873) 
 Lebia exigua Kirsch, 1873 
 Lebia exilis Andrewes, 1947 
 Lebia eximia Peringuey, 1896 
 Lebia exsanguis Bates, 1886 
 Lebia externa Darlington, 1968 
 Lebia extrema Bates, 1883 
 Lebia fabriziobattonii Kirschenhofer, 1986
 Lebia fallaciosa Baehr, 2004 
 Lebia fasciola (Fabricius, 1801) 
 Lebia fatua Liebke, 1938 
 Lebia fenestrata (Chaudoir, 1871) 
 Lebia festinans Liebke, 1935 
 Lebia figurata (Chaudoir, 1871) 
 Lebia fimbriolata Bates, 1883 
 Lebia flammea Bates, 1883 
 Lebia flavipes Chaudoir, 1871 
 Lebia flavofasciata Brulle, 1838 
 Lebia flavoguttata Chaudoir, 1871 
 Lebia flavopicta Liebke, 1938 
 Lebia flohri Bates, 1883 (Lebia) 
 Lebia focki Kuntzen, 1919 
 Lebia formosana Jedlicka, 1946
 Lebia foveipennis Baehr, 2004 
 Lebia frenata (Chaudoir, 1871) 
 Lebia freudei Jedlicka, 1966
 Lebia fruhstorferi Liebke, 1938 
 Lebia fukiensis Jedlicka, 1953
 Lebia furcatula Liebke, 1934 
 Lebia fuscata Dejean, 1825 
 Lebia fusciceps Chaudoir, 1871 
 Lebia fuscula Chaudoir, 1871
 Lebia gabonica Chaudoir, 1871 
 Lebia gansuensis Jedlicka, 1933 
 Lebia garambae Basilewsky, 1962 
 Lebia gaudichaudi Castelnau, 1835 
 Lebia gemina Baehr, 2004 
 Lebia gibba Darlington, 1935 
 Lebia gloriosa Liebke, 1938 
 Lebia goniessa Bates, 1883 
 Lebia goudoti (Chaudoir, 1871) 
 Lebia gounellei Liebke, 1935  
 Lebia grammica Perty, 1830 
 Lebia granaria Putzeys, 1846 
 Lebia graphica Liebke, 1938 
 Lebia grata Liebke, 1939 
 Lebia gratiosa (Chaudoir, 1871) 
 Lebia gressoria Chaudoir, 1871 
 Lebia guttata Motschulsky, 1864 
 Lebia guttula Leconte, 1851 
 Lebia guyanensis Chaudoir, 1871 
 Lebia haitiana Darlington, 1935 
 Lebia halli Basilewsky, 1948 
 Lebia halmaherae Baehr, 2010 
 Lebia hamata Liebke, 1938 
 Lebia handenia Basilewsky, 1962 
 Lebia haplomera Chaudoir, 1871 
 Lebia heraldica Bates, 1883 
 Lebia heydeni Putzeys, 1846 
 Lebia heyrovskyi Jedlicka, 1933 
 Lebia hilaris (Chaudoir, 1871) 
 Lebia hirsutula Basilewsky, 1962 
 Lebia histrionica Bates, 1883 
 Lebia holomera Chaudoir, 1871 
 Lebia horni Liebke, 1934  
 Lebia humeralis Dejean, 1825
 Lebia humeroguttata (Chaudoir, 1871) 
 Lebia ignita Bates, 1883 
 Lebia illustris Liebke, 1938 
 Lebia imitator Peringuey, 1896  
 Lebia imperfecta Liebke, 1934 
 Lebia incohaerens Chaudoir, 1871 
 Lebia incommoda Chaudoir, 1871 
 Lebia inconspicua Peringuey, 1896 
 Lebia inconstans Bates, 1883 
 Lebia inedita Peringuey, 1904 
 Lebia inornata Baehr, 2004 
 Lebia insecticollis Landin, 1955 
 Lebia insularis Boheman, 1859 
 Lebia insularum Darlington, 1968 
 Lebia insulata Madge, 1967 
 Lebia intermedia (Chaudoir, 1871) 
 Lebia irregularis Chaudoir, 1871 
 Lebia ivorensis Basilewsky, 1968  
 Lebia jacksoni Basilewsky, 1948 
 Lebia jeanneli Liebke, 1935  
 Lebia jedlickai Liebke, 1935 
 Lebia jucunda Kirsch, 1873 
 Lebia jureceki Jedlicka, 1933 
 Lebia karenia Bates, 1892 
 Lebia kayetea Liebke, 1935 
 Lebia klapperichi Jedlicka, 1953 
 Lebia klickai Jedlicka, 1933 
 Lebia lacerata Chaudoir, 1871 
 Lebia lacerta Andrewes, 1929 
 Lebia laetula Chaudoir, 1871 
 Lebia lapaza Liebke, 1935 
 Lebia lata Landin, 1955 
 Lebia lateplagiata Basilewsky, 1949 
 Lebia laticollis Baehr, 2004 
 Lebia latifascia Chaudoir, 1871 
 Lebia latiuscula (Chaudoir, 1871) 
 Lebia lauta Liebke, 1938 
 Lebia lecta G.Horn, 1885 
 Lebia lemoulti Basilewsky, 1948 
 Lebia lepida Brulle, 1834
 Lebia leprieuri Dejean, 1831 
 Lebia leptodera (Chaudoir, 1871) 
 Lebia lesnei Liebke, 1935 
 Lebia leucaspis Andrewes, 1936 
 Lebia levicula Liebke, 1938 
 Lebia libita Liebke, 1938 
 Lebia limbata Steinheil, 1875 
 Lebia lindemannae Jedlicka, 1963 
 Lebia lineola Andrewes, 1929 
 Lebia lobulata Leconte, 1863 
 Lebia longiloba Chaudoir, 1871 
 Lebia longipennis Putzeys, 1846 
 Lebia lubrica Liebke, 1938 
 Lebia lunigera Andrewes, 1933 
 Lebia luteocincta Chaudoir, 1871 
 Lebia luteofasciata Chaudoir, 1871 
 Lebia luzoensis Jedlicka, 1933 
 Lebia maculicollis Putzeys, 1846 
 Lebia marani Jedlicka, 1933 
 Lebia maraniana Kult, 1943 
 Lebia marginata (Geoffroy, 1785) 
 Lebia marginicollis Dejean, 1825 
 Lebia masaica Basilewsky, 1962 
 Lebia maya Bates, 1883 
 Lebia maynei Burgeon, 1937 
 Lebia mayumbensis Basilewsky, 1967 
 Lebia meinkeana Jedlicka, 1965 
 Lebia melanonota Chaudoir, 1871 
 Lebia melanoptera Chaudoir, 1871 
 Lebia melantho Bates, 1883  
 Lebia menetriesi Ballion, 1869 
 Lebia mesostigma Bates, 1883 
 Lebia mesoxantha (Kirsch, 1873) 
 Lebia microtes Bates, 1883 
 Lebia minarum Putzeys, 1846 
 Lebia mindanaensis Jedlicka, 1933 
 Lebia minima Peringuey, 1899 
 Lebia minuscula Liebke, 1938 
 Lebia minuta Chaudoir, 1871 
 Lebia minutula Basilewsky, 1949 
 Lebia mira Basilewsky, 1948 
 Lebia mirabilis Bates, 1883 
 Lebia mirabunda Liebke, 1938 
 Lebia miranda (G.Horn, 1872) 
 Lebia mirifica Jedlicka, 1956
 Lebia misabena Basilewsky, 1968 
 Lebia miwai Jedlicka, 1951 
 Lebia moesta Leconte, 1850 
 Lebia monostigma Andrewes, 1923 
 Lebia monteithi Baehr, 2004  
 Lebia montivaga Liebke, 1938 
 Lebia mushai Jedlicka, 1951
 Lebia myops Dejean, 1831 
 Lebia natalis Peringuey, 1899  
 Lebia neanthe Bates, 1883 
 Lebia nemoralis Chaudoir, 1871 
 Lebia nevermanni Liebke, 1939  
 Lebia nigricapitata Madge, 1967 
 Lebia nigriceps Chaudoir, 1871 
 Lebia nigrita Darlington, 1935 
 Lebia nigrofasciata Putzeys, 1846 
 Lebia nigrolineata Reiche, 1842 
 Lebia nigromaculata Gory, 1833 
 Lebia nilotica Chaudoir, 1871
 Lebia novabritannica Baehr, 2004 
 Lebia nubicola Darlington, 1939 
 Lebia obenbergeri Jedlicka, 1933 
 Lebia obscurata Liebke, 1940 
 Lebia obscuriceps Chaudoir, 1871 
 Lebia obsoleta Chaudoir, 1871 
 Lebia ocellata Andrewes, 1933 
 Lebia ohausi Liebke, 1939  
 Lebia olivacea Chaudoir, 1850 
 Lebia oliviella Bates, 1883 
 Lebia omostigma Chaudoir, 1871 
 Lebia orissa Basilewsky, 1962 
 Lebia ornamentalis Liebke, 1938 
 Lebia ornata Say, 1823 
 Lebia pallida Reichardt, 1972 
 Lebia pallipes Gory, 1833 
 Lebia papuella Darlington, 1968 
 Lebia papuensis W.J.Macleay, 1876 
 Lebia paramicola Moret, 2005 
 Lebia pauliana Liebke, 1938 
 Lebia pectita G.Horn, 1885 
 Lebia peguensis Jedlicka, 1965 
 Lebia peregrinator Peringuey, 1896 
 Lebia perita Casey, 1920 
 Lebia permutata Baehr, 2004 
 Lebia perpallida Madge, 1967 
 Lebia perspicillaris (Chaudoir, 1871) 
 Lebia peruana Lutshnik, 1922 
 Lebia phantasma Peringuey, 1904 
 Lebia picicollis Chaudoir, 1871 
 Lebia picolina Liebke, 1935 
 Lebia picta Steinheil, 1875 
 Lebia pilula Liebke, 1938 
 Lebia placida Basilewsky, 1949 
 Lebia planiuscula Chaudoir, 1871 
 Lebia platensis (Chaudoir, 1871) 
 Lebia plaumanni Liebke, 1938  
 Lebia pleuritica Leconte, 1848 
 Lebia pleurodera Chaudoir, 1871 
 Lebia poecilura Bates, 1883 
 Lebia promontorii Peringuey, 1908 
 Lebia pseudolytata Basilewsky, 1949 
 Lebia puella Dejean, 1831 
 Lebia pulchella Dejean, 1826 
 Lebia pulla (Chaudoir, 1871) 
 Lebia pumila Dejean, 1831 
 Lebia pusilla Brulle, 1838 
 Lebia putzeysi Bedel, 1878 
 Lebia quadratica Liebke, 1935 
 Lebia quadraticollis Liebke, 1938 
 Lebia quadricolor Chevrolat, 1834 
 Lebia quadrimaculata (Motschulsky, 1864) 
 Lebia quadriplagiata (Chaudoir, 1871) 
 Lebia quadritincta Chaudoir, 1871 
 Lebia quinquenotata Chaudoir, 1871 
 Lebia reflexicollis Chaudoir, 1843 
 Lebia renalis Liebke, 1935 
 Lebia resurgens Chaudoir, 1871 
 Lebia reticulata Liebke, 1938 
 Lebia retusa Bates, 1883 
 Lebia reventazonica Liebke, 1936 
 Lebia rhodope Bates, 1883 
 Lebia rhombifera Louwerens, 1953 
 Lebia rhyticrania Chaudoir, 1871 
 Lebia riedeli Liebke, 1939 
 Lebia rotundipennis Putzeys, 1846 
 Lebia ruficeps (Chaudoir, 1871) 
 Lebia rufopleura Schaeffer, 1910 
 Lebia rugatifrons (Chaudoir, 1871) 
 Lebia rugiceps Brulle, 1838 
 Lebia rugifrons Dejean, 1831 
 Lebia rutilia Bates, 1883 
 Lebia ruwenzorica Burgeon, 1937 
 Lebia salomona Baehr, 2004 
 Lebia scalata Liebke, 1935 
 Lebia scalpta Bates, 1883 
 Lebia scapula G.Horn, 1885 
 Lebia scapularis (Geoffroy, 1785) 
 Lebia schmidtgoebeli Lorenz, 1998 
 Lebia schoutedeni Burgeon, 1937 
 Lebia scitula Chaudoir, 1871 
 Lebia sculpticollis Liebke, 1939 
 Lebia sebakuana Peringuey, 1908 
 Lebia securigera (Chaudoir, 1871) 
 Lebia sedlaceki Baehr, 2004 
 Lebia sellata Dejean, 1825 
 Lebia senegalensis Chaudoir, 1871 
 Lebia sericea Liebke, 1935 
 Lebia sexmaculata Buquet, 1834 
 Lebia sharovae Basilewsky, 1962 
 Lebia shimbana Basilewsky, 1948 
 Lebia similis Chaudoir, 1871 
 Lebia simillima Chaudoir, 1871 
 Lebia simoni Liebke, 1935  
 Lebia simulatoria Peringuey, 1904 
 Lebia sinanja Bates, 1883 
 Lebia singaporensis Jedlicka, 1933 
 Lebia smaragdinipennis Reiche, 1842  
 Lebia smithiella Bates, 1891 
 Lebia solea Hentz, 1830 
 Lebia soror Chaudoir, 1871 
 Lebia speciosa Peringuey, 1896 
 Lebia sperabilis Peringuey, 1899 
 Lebia steinbachi Liebke, 1938 
 Lebia stepaneki Jedlicka, 1951
 Lebia sticticeps Chaudoir, 1871 
 Lebia strandi Liebke, 1939  
 Lebia straneoi Basilewsky, 1948  
 Lebia striaticeps Chaudoir, 1871 
 Lebia striaticollis Chaudoir, 1835 
 Lebia striatifrons Chaudoir, 1871 
 Lebia subfasciata Chaudoir, 1871 
 Lebia subglabra Baehr, 2004 
 Lebia subinterrupta Chaudoir, 1871 
 Lebia submaculata Motschulsky, 1864 
 Lebia subrugosa Chaudoir, 1871 
 Lebia subtilis (Chaudoir, 1871) 
 Lebia sulcata Dejean, 1825 
 Lebia sulcatella Liebke, 1935 
 Lebia sulciceps Liebke, 1935 
 Lebia sulcipennis Chaudoir, 1870 
 Lebia susterai Jedlicka, 1951
 Lebia syriaca Pic, 1901
 Lebia tanarataensis Kirschenhofer, 2003 
 Lebia tanta Jedlicka, 1933 
 Lebia tau Schmidt-Goebel, 1846 
 Lebia tendicula Liebke, 1938 
 Lebia tenella Peringuey, 1908 
 Lebia tenenbaumi Liebke, 1938 
 Lebia tericola Darlington, 1939 
 Lebia terminalis Putzeys, 1846 
 Lebia testudinea (Chaudoir, 1871) 
 Lebia thais Bedel, 1897
 Lebia tigrana Liebke, 1939 
 Lebia togata Liebke, 1935 
 Lebia tolteca Bates, 1883 
 Lebia trapezicollis (Chaudoir, 1871) 
 Lebia tremolerasi Liebke, 1938 
 Lebia trigona Liebke, 1935 
 Lebia trimaculata (Villers, 1789) 
 Lebia trisignata Brulle, 1838 
 Lebia tropica Liebke, 1934 
 Lebia trullata Liebke, 1938 
 Lebia truncatipennis Landin, 1955 
 Lebia tsaritsa Basilewsky, 1948 
 Lebia tschitscherini Lutshnik, 1922  
 Lebia tuckeri (Casey, 1920)  
 Lebia turkestanica Jedlicka, 1966 
 Lebia umbrata Chaudoir, 1871 
 Lebia umtalina Peringuey, 1904  
 Lebia unimaculata Motschulsky, 1864 
 Lebia vaciva Peringuey, 1899 
 Lebia vagans Peringuey, 1896  
 Lebia variegata Dejean, 1831 
 Lebia venezolana Liebke, 1938 
 Lebia venustula Dejean, 1831 
 Lebia vianai Liebke, 1939  
 Lebia vicina (Chaudoir, 1871) 
 Lebia vilcanota Liebke, 1934 
 Lebia violacea Chaudoir, 1871 
 Lebia violata Jedlicka, 1963
 Lebia viridipennis Dejean, 1826 
 Lebia viridis Say, 1823 
 Lebia viriditincta Basilewsky, 1962 
 Lebia vittata (Fabricius, 1777) 
 Lebia vittigera Dejean, 1831 
 Lebia wagneri Liebke, 1935 
 Lebia weigeli Baehr, 2005 
 Lebia wittei Burgeon, 1937  
 Lebia x-nigrum Putzeys, 1846 
 Lebia xanthogona Bates, 1883 
 Lebia xanthophaea Chaudoir, 1871 
 Lebia xanthopleura Chaudoir, 1871 
 Lebia yucatana Chaudoir, 1871 
 Lebia yunnana Jedlicka, 1933
 Lebia zaboli Jedlicka, 1968
 Lebia zanzibarica Chaudoir, 1878 
 Lebia zeta Bates, 1883 
 Lebia zonata Chaudoir, 1850 
 Lebia zuluensis Csiki, 1932

Subgenus Liopeza
 Lebia thoracella Lorenz, 1998

Subgenus Loxopeza

 Lebia angustula Oberthur, 1883 
 Lebia atriceps Leconte, 1863 
 Lebia atriventris Say, 1823 
 Lebia calomicra Bates, 1891 
 Lebia chloroptera Chaudoir, 1835 
 Lebia costulata (Bates, 1883) 
 Lebia cyane (Bates, 1883) 
 Lebia deceptrix Madge, 1967 
 Lebia eburata (Bates, 1883) 
 Lebia grandis Hentz, 1830 
 Lebia guatemalena (Bates, 1883) 
 Lebia hoegei (Bates, 1883) 
 Lebia melanocephala (Chaudoir, 1871) 
 Lebia obliquata Dejean, 1831 
 Lebia pimalis (Casey, 1920) 
 Lebia rufolimbata (Chaudoir, 1871) 
 Lebia rufosutura Motschulsky, 1864 
 Lebia striata Dejean, 1831 
 Lebia subdola Madge, 1967 
 Lebia subgrandis Madge, 1967 
 Lebia translucens (Bates, 1883) 
 Lebia tricolor Say, 1823 
 Lebia urania (Bates, 1883) 
 Lebia xanthogaster (Bates, 1883) 
 Lebia yoloensis (Bates, 1883)

Subgenus Metalebia

 Lebia alluaudana Jeannel, 1949 
 Lebia antelobata (Basilewsky, 1955) 
 Lebia atsima Alluaud, 1936 
 Lebia brunneipennis Jeannel, 1949 
 Lebia calycina Gerstaecker, 1866 
 Lebia cerrutii (Basilewsky, 1953) 
 Lebia consobrina Jeannel, 1949 
 Lebia decorsei Alluaud, 1936  
 Lebia distinctenotata (Basilewsky, 1956) 
 Lebia fortuita Peringuey, 1899 
 Lebia franzi Mateu, 1970 
 Lebia ghesquierei Basilewsky, 1949 
 Lebia katangana (Basilewsky, 1953) 
 Lebia kivuensis Burgeon, 1937 
 Lebia lytata Motschulsky, 1864 
 Lebia madagascariensis Chaudoir, 1850 
 Lebia mirana Alluaud, 1936 
 Lebia monticola Barker, 1919 
 Lebia nanna Jeannel, 1949 
 Lebia natalensis Chaudoir, 1871 
 Lebia nigrocincta (Basilewsky, 1956) 
 Lebia nyamukubiensis Burgeon, 1937 
 Lebia omoxantha Alluaud, 1936 
 Lebia parvicollis Jeannel, 1949 
 Lebia perrieri Jeannel, 1949  
 Lebia pseudogabonica Basilewsky, 1949 
 Lebia rufa Jeannel, 1949 
 Lebia seyrigi Alluaud, 1936  
 Lebia sicardi Jeannel, 1949  
 Lebia stappersi Burgeon, 1937 
 Lebia sulcipennoides Lorenz, 1998 
 Lebia tanala Alluaud, 1936 
 Lebia transvaalensis Peringuey, 1896  
 Lebia uelensis Burgeon, 1937  
 Lebia vadoni Alluaud, 1936 
 Lebia viridella Lorenz, 1998

Subgenus Nomatopeza

 Lebia aerea (Jeannel, 1949) 
 Lebia alluaudi (Jeannel, 1949)  
 Lebia ambreana (Jeannel, 1949) 
 Lebia andreinii Straneo, 1943 
 Lebia androyana (Jeannel, 1949) 
 Lebia antanosy (Jeannel, 1949) 
 Lebia auberti Fairmaire, 1892 
 Lebia baconi (Chaudoir, 1871) 
 Lebia basalis Chaudoir, 1852  
 Lebia biplagiata Motschulsky, 1864 
 Lebia bohumilae (Basilewsky, 1956) 
 Lebia chaudoiri (Alluaud, 1932) 
 Lebia comorica (Jeannel, 1949)  
 Lebia damarica Kuntzen, 1919 
 Lebia diegana Alluaud, 1897 
 Lebia dolorosa (Basilewsky, 1956) 
 Lebia elisabethana Burgeon, 1937 
 Lebia evicta P?Ringuey, 1904 
 Lebia exiguella Lorenz, 1998 
 Lebia fraterna Peringuey, 1896  
 Lebia fumata (Chaudoir, 1878) 
 Lebia immaculata Boheman, 1848 
 Lebia indagacea Fairmaire, 1904 
 Lebia indica Liebke, 1938 
 Lebia insidiosa Peringuey, 1896 
 Lebia invicta Peringuey, 1896 
 Lebia kalabe (Jeannel, 1949) 
 Lebia kalosa (Jeannel, 1949) 
 Lebia lebisi (Jeannel, 1949) 
 Lebia leleupi Basilewsky, 1951  
 Lebia lividipennis (Chaudoir, 1878) 
 Lebia lualabana (Basilewsky, 1953) 
 Lebia lucidicollis (Jeannel, 1949) 
 Lebia melanacra (Chaudoir, 1878) 
 Lebia melanura Dejean, 1831 
 Lebia miniata Lorenz, 1998 
 Lebia modesta Boheman, 1848 
 Lebia nobilis Boheman, 1848 
 Lebia obesa (Jeannel, 1949) 
 Lebia obtusa (Jeannel, 1949) 
 Lebia olsoufieffi (Jeannel, 1949)  
 Lebia perinetana (Jeannel, 1949) 
 Lebia pervicina Lorenz, 1998 
 Lebia picea (Jeannel, 1949) 
 Lebia pusillima Lorenz, 1998 
 Lebia ripicola Kuntzen, 1919 
 Lebia sahy (Jeannel, 1949) 
 Lebia semicyanea Fairmaire, 1901 
 Lebia sicardiana (Jeannel, 1949) 
 Lebia silvatica (Jeannel, 1949) 
 Lebia silvestris (Jeannel, 1949) 
 Lebia stricticollis (Jeannel, 1949) 
 Lebia submetallica (Jeannel, 1949) 
 Lebia verisimilis Barker, 1919 
 Lebia viridicolor Lorenz, 1998

Subgenus Nipponolebia
 Lebia duplex Bates, 1883

Subgenus Poecilostota
 Lebia discophora (Chaudoir, 1871)
 Lebia nebulosa (Chaudoir, 1871)
 Lebia opima (Liebke, 1939)
 Lebia pendula Putzeys, 1846

Subgenus Poecilothais

 Lebia aglaia Andrewes, 1930 
 Lebia benoiti (Basilewsky, 1952) 
 Lebia bifenestrata A. Morawitz, 1862 
 Lebia bisbinotata Murray, 1857 
 Lebia calycophora Schmidt-Goebel, 1846 
 Lebia cognatella Lorenz, 1998 
 Lebia consors (Peringuey, 1899) 
 Lebia cucphuongensis Kirschenhofer, 2010 
 Lebia deplanata Gerstaecker, 1866 
 Lebia fassatii Jedlicka, 1951 
 Lebia fusca A. Morawitz, 1863
 Lebia gentilis (Peringuey, 1896)  
 Lebia hikosana Habu, 1955 
 Lebia humpatensis (Bates, 1889) 
 Lebia hypoxantha Gerstaecker, 1866 
 Lebia idae Bates, 1873 
 Lebia iolanthe Bates, 1883 
 Lebia madecassa Alluaud, 1936 
 Lebia nepalensis Kirschenhofer, 2010 
 Lebia picipennis Motschulsky, 1864 
 Lebia purkynei Jedlicka, 1933 
 Lebia retrofasciata Motschulsky, 1864 
 Lebia roubali Jedlicka, 1951
 Lebia sandaligera Bates, 1873 
 Lebia stackelbergi Kryzhanovskij, 1987 
 Lebia stichai Jedlicka, 1933 
 Lebia sylvarum Bates, 1883 
 Lebia temburongensis Kirschenhofer, 2010 
 Lebia tuongensis Kirschenhofer, 2010 
 Lebia zhejiangensis Kirschenhofer, 2010 

Subgenus Polycheloma
 Lebia lecontei Madge, 1967

Subgenus Promecochila
 Lebia capensis Chaudoir, 1835
 Lebia nigra (Peringuey, 1896)

Subgenus Rhytidopeza
 Lebia catalai (Jeannel, 1949)
 Lebia puncticollis (Jeannel, 1949)

Subgenus Stephana
 Lebia princeps Chaudoir, 1852

References